Events from the year 1939 in Michigan.

Office holders

State office holders

 Governor of Michigan: Frank Fitzgerald (Republican)/Luren Dickinson (Republican)
 Lieutenant Governor of Michigan: Luren D. Dickinson (Republican)
 Michigan Attorney General: Thomas Read (Republican)
 Michigan Secretary of State: Harry Kelly (Republican)
 Speaker of the Michigan House of Representatives: Howard Nugent (Republican)
 Chief Justice, Michigan Supreme Court:

Mayors of major cities

 Mayor of Detroit: Richard Reading (Republican)
 Mayor of Grand Rapids: George W. Welsh
 Mayor of Flint: Harry M. Comins
 Mayor of Saginaw: Francis J. McDonald/John W. Symons, Jr.
 Mayor of Lansing: Max A. Templeton
 Mayor of Ann Arbor: Walter C. Sadler

Federal office holders

 U.S. Senator from Michigan: Prentiss M. Brown (Democrat)
 U.S. Senator from Michigan: Arthur Vandenberg (Republican) 
 House District 1: Rudolph G. Tenerowicz (Democrat)
 House District 2: Earl C. Michener (Republican)
 House District 3: Paul W. Shafer (Republican)
 House District 4: Clare Hoffman (Republican)
 House District 5: Bartel J. Jonkman (Republican)
 House District 6: William W. Blackney (Republican)
 House District 7: Jesse P. Wolcott (Republican)
 House District 8: Fred L. Crawford (Republican)
 House District 9: Albert J. Engel (Republican)
 House District 10: Roy O. Woodruff (Republican)
 House District 11: Frederick Van Ness Bradley (Republican)
 House District 12: Frank Eugene Hook (Democrat)
 House District 13: Clarence J. McLeod (Republican)
 House District 14: Louis C. Rabaut (Democrat)
 House District 15: John D. Dingell Sr. (Democrat)
 House District 16: John Lesinski Sr. (Democrat)
 House District 17: George Anthony Dondero (Republican)

Population

Sports

Baseball

 1939 Detroit Tigers season – Under manager Del Baker, the Tigers compiled an 81-73 record and finished in fifth place in the American League. The team's statistical leaders included Charlie Gehringer with a .325 batting average, Hank Greenberg with 33 home runs and 113 RBIs, Tommy Bridges and Bobo Newsom with 17 wins each, and Newsom with a 3.37 earned run average.
 1939 Michigan Wolverines baseball season - Under head coach Ray Fisher, the Wolverines compiled an 18–9–2 record. Walter Peckinpaugh was the team captain.

American football

 1939 Detroit Lions season – Under head coach Gus Henderson, the Lions compiled a 6–5 record and placed third in the NFL's Western Division. The team's statistical leaders included Dwight Sloan with 658 passing yards, Bill Shepherd with 420 rushing yards, and Chuck Hanneman with 257 receiving yards and 29 points scored. 
 1939 Michigan Wolverines football team – Under head coach Fritz Crisler, the Wolverines compiled a 6–2 record, tied for fourth place in the Big Ten Conference, and were ranked No. 20 in the final AP Poll. Tom Harmon was selected as the team's Most Valuable Player and was also named a consensus All-American.
 1939 Michigan State Spartans football team – Under head coach Charlie Bachman, the Spartans compiled a 4–4–1 record.
 1939 Detroit Titans football team – The Titans compiled a 5–3–1 record under head coach Gus Dorais.
 1939 Central Michigan Bearcats football team - Under head coach Ron Finch the Bercats compiled an 8–1 record.
 1938 Western State Hilltoppers football team - Under head coach Mike Gary, the Hilltoppers compiled a 2–6–1 record.
 1939 Michigan State Normal Hurons football team - Under head coach Elton Rynearson, the Hurons compiled a 3–3–1 record.
 1939 Wayne Tartars football team – The Tartars compiled a 4–5 record under head coach Joe Gembis.

Basketball
 1938–39 Detroit Titans men's basketball team – Under head coach Lloyd Brazil, the Titans compiled a 15–5 record.
 1938–39 Wayne Tartars men's basketball team – Under coach Newman Ertell, Wayne compiled a 14–5 record.
 1938–39 Michigan Wolverines men's basketball team – Under head coach Bennie Oosterbaan, the Wolverines compiled an 11–9 record. 
 1938–39 Michigan State Spartans men's basketball team – Under head coach Benjamin Van Alstyne, the Spartans compiled a 9–8 record.
 1938–39 Western Michigan Broncos men's basketball team – Under head coach Buck Read, the Broncos compiled a 7–10 record.

Ice hockey

 1938–39 Detroit Red Wings season – Under coach Jack Adams, the Red Wings compiled an 18–24–6 record and finished in fifth place in the National Hockey League (NHL). The team's statistical leaders included Syd Howe with 16 goals, Marty Barry and 41 points. Tiny Thompson was the team's goaltender. 
 1938–39 Michigan Wolverines men's ice hockey team – Under head coach Ed Lowrey, the Wolverines compiled an 8–8–2 record.
 1938–39 Michigan Tech Huskies men's ice hockey team – Under head coach Ed Maki, the Huskies compiled a 6–8 record.

Other
 Port Huron to Mackinac Boat Race – In the 15th annual sailing race, Manitou skippered by James R. Lowe, won the racing-cruising division, and Iolanthe, a 36-foot yawl, won the cruising class.
 Michigan Open - Marvin Stahl from Lansing won his third Michigan Open title on July 30 at the Western Golf and Country Club in Redford.
 APBA Gold Cup – On September 4, Zalmon G. Simmons' My Sin won the Gold Cup powerboat race on the Detroit River with an average speed of 66.227 miles per hour.

Chronology of events
 January 1 - Upon leaving office as Governor of Michigan, Frank Murphy was chosen by President Franklin D. Roosevelt as the United States Attorney General.
 January 2 - Frank Fitzgerald and Luren Dickinson were sworn in as Governor and Lieutenant Governor in a ceremony in the House chamber in Lansing.
 January 2 - Frank Murphy was sworn in as Attorney General in a ceremony at the White House with President Roosevelt present.
 January 7 - UAW president Homer Martin suspended all of the officers in UAW Local 51 in Plymouth which he charged was dominated by Communists and which he referred to as "Moscow Square". The suspensions led to calls for the union's executive board to meet, and for Martin to be removed as union president. The board suspended Martin's duty as editor of the union's weekly newspaper on January 11, and reinstated the suspended officers from Local 51 on January 12. On January 13, 3,000 U.A.W members, starting with a pro-Martin and followed by an anti-Martin faction, occupied the Griswold building where the UAW had its headquarters, cut off elevator service, and packed the stairways from the first to eleventh floors. On January 17, the board called for special convention of delegates to be held in Cleveland on March 20.
 January 17 - The Senate voted to confirm Frank Murphy as Attorney General with seven dissenting votes. Michigan Senator Vandenberg opposed the confirmation.
 January 20 - The UAW executive board voted to impeach union president Homer Martin.  Martin then suspended 15 of the 24 board members and announced that the new board had voted to reinstate him.
 January 23 - The suspended members of the UAW executive board named R. J. Thomas as the union's acting president to replace Homer Martin. They also voted to suspend the executive board members retained by Martin. On January 24, CIO officials in Washington, D.C., repudiated Martin and recognized Thomas as the UAW's president. Martin responded that the action was a declaration of war by the CIO against the UAW and that John L. Lewis was seeking to become the dictator of organized labor.

Births
 January 23 - Brothers Hildebrandt, fantasy and science fiction artists, in Detroit
 February 3 - Johnny Bristol, musician, most famous as a songwriter and record producer for Motown, in Detroit
 April 5 - Ronald White, co-founder of The Miracles, in Detroit
 April 7 - Francis Ford Coppola, film director, in Detroit
 April 10 - Alan Rothenberg, lawyer and sports executive, President of the U.S. Soccer Federation (1990–1998), in Detroit
 April 23 - Lee Majors, actor (The Big Valley, The Six Million Dollar Man, The Fall Guy), in Wyandotte, Michigan
 May 11 - Milt Pappas, Major League Baseball pitcher (1957–1973) and 3x All-Star, in Detroit
 June 6 - Richard "Popcorn" Wylie, pianist, bandleader, songwriter, occasional singer, and record producer, in Detroit
 September 1 - Lily Tomlin, actress, comedian, and writer (Rowan & Martin's Laugh-In, Nashville, Grace and Frankie), in Detroit
 October 30 - Eddie Holland, a member of Motown's Holland–Dozier–Holland songwriting and production team, in Detroit
 November 3 - Howard Wolpe, U.S. Congressman (1979-1993), in Saugatuck, Michigan
 November 19 - Warren "Pete" Moore, bass singer for The Miracles, in Detroit
 December 11 - Tom Hayden, activist, author and politician, best for his role as an anti-war, civil rights, and counterculture activist, in Detroit
 December 20 - Kim Weston, Motown singer, in Detroit

Gallery of 1939 births

Deaths
 March 16 - Frank Fitzgerald, Governor of Michigan (1935-1937, 1939), at age 54 in Grand Ledge, Michigan
 March 16 - Sam Dungan, star player of the Detroit Creams/Tigers from 1894-1899, at age 72 in Santa Ana, California
 June 26 - Ford Madox Ford, novelist (The Good Soldier) who taught at Olivet College, at age 65 in France
 July 7 - Deacon White, baseball player from 1868-1890, at age 91 in St. Charles Township, Illinois
 September 29 - Irving Kane Pond, architect, scored the first touchdown in University of Michigan football history in 1879, at age 82 in Washington, D.C.
 December 12 - Carl E. Mapes, U.S. Congressman (1913–1939), at age 64

Gallery of 1939 deaths

See also
 History of Michigan
 History of Detroit

References